Timothy F. Hennessey (born November 4, 1947) is a Republican former member of the Pennsylvania House of Representatives who represented the 26th District from 1993 to 2022.

Career
Prior to being elected, Hennessey was an attorney in private practice, also serving as a township solicitor and a trial attorney in the Chester County Public Defender's Office.

He was elected to the House in 1992 and has been re-elected twelve times.

Hennessey served as the Chairman of the Transportation Committee.

In 2022, Hennessey lost his bid for reelection to Paul Friel.

Personal
Representative Hennessey is a 1965 graduate of St. Pius X High School. He earned a Bachelor of Science degree from St. Joseph’s University in 1969, and his Juris Doctor degree in 1972 from Villanova University School of Law.  He and his wife live in North Coventry Township, Pennsylvania.  They have three children.

References

External links
State Representative Tim Hennessey official PA House website

1947 births
Living people
Republican Party members of the Pennsylvania House of Representatives
Saint Joseph's University alumni
Villanova University School of Law alumni
21st-century American politicians

Politicians from Chester County, Pennsylvania
20th-century American politicians